Touho  is a municipality (commune) in the North Province of New Caledonia, an overseas territory of France in the Pacific Ocean. Touho lies on the east coast of the main island (Grande Terre) and is served by a road and an airfield.

The vocational school, Lycée Professionnel Augustin Ty, was officially opened in 1994. It is located directly opposite the airport.

Geography

Climate

Touho has a tropical rainforest climate (Köppen climate classification Af).

References

Communes of New Caledonia